Tylopilus montoyae is a bolete fungus in the family Boletaceae found in Veracruz, Mexico, where it grows in mesophilous (moderate temperature) montane forest. It was described as new to science in 1991.

See also
List of North American boletes

References

External links

mitissimus
Fungi described in 1991
Fungi of Mexico
Fungi without expected TNC conservation status